Connor Oliver (born 17 January 1994) is an English semi-professional footballer who plays as a defender or a midfielder for North Shields.

Career
Oliver was born in Newcastle, Tyne and Wear. He began his career with Sunderland and after progressing thorough the youth teams before joining Hartlepool United on loan in March 2014. He made his professional debut on 12 April 2014 in a 2–1 defeat against Chesterfield.

On 9 January 2015, Oliver signed for Blackpool on an 18-month contract. After Neil McDonald became the new manager at Blackpool, Oliver saw limited game time and in March 2016 was loaned out to League Two club Morecambe for the rest of the season, debuting off the bench at halftime against Plymouth on 26 March.

Oliver signed for newly promoted National League club North Ferriby United on 25 July 2016.

In August 2018, Oliver joined Blyth Spartans. He played for the club until 13 June 2019, where he joined Gateshead.

On 4 August 2020, Oliver signed for Morpeth Town. 

On 29th June 2022, Oliver signed for  North Shields

Career statistics

References

External links

1994 births
Living people
Footballers from Newcastle upon Tyne
English footballers
Association football defenders
Association football midfielders
Sunderland A.F.C. players
Hartlepool United F.C. players
Blackpool F.C. players
Morecambe F.C. players
North Ferriby United A.F.C. players
FC Halifax Town players
Blyth Spartans A.F.C. players
Gateshead F.C. players
Morpeth Town A.F.C. players
North Shields F.C. players
English Football League players
National League (English football) players
Northern Premier League players